Dalinghosaurus (often incorrectly spelled "Dalinghesaurus") is an extinct genus of lizards, first described in 1998 by S.A. Ji of the Peking University Department of Geology. The type species is Dalinghosaurus longidigitus. It is known from the Early Cretaceous (Aptian) aged Yixian Formation of Liaoning, China.

Description

Dalinghosaurus had extremely long tails and hindlimbs relative to its forelimbs. The claws are relatively slender.

Eleven specimens of Dalinghosaurus are held by the IVPP in Beijing. One fossil skeleton contains the skeletons of ten or more juveniles. A possible specimen of Dalinghosaurus has been found in the gut region of a Sinosauropteryx.

Classification

Although it lived during the Early Cretaceous, A 2005 study found that Dalinghosaurus was  related to several modern-day lizards in the family Xenosauridae, the knob-scaled lizards. Its relatives include the modern Chinese crocodile lizard (Shinisaurus) of southern China, the extinct Exostinus of Montana and Wyoming, and the extinct Carusia of Mongolia. It is differentiated from Carusia by having fewer, more conical shaped teeth. Differences in skull and mandible shape separate it from Shinisaurus.

Paleobiology
The long legs of Dalinghosaurus indicate that it was a proficient runner across open environments, potentially capable of bipedal locomotion. However, it may also have been capable of arboreal locomotion.

References

Cretaceous lizards
Early Cretaceous reptiles of Asia
Fossil taxa described in 1998